Lenughi (until 1946, Aghlanli Nerkin and Yasakhli) is a village in the Armavir Province of Armenia. The town's church, dedicated to Saint Nshan, dates from the 1870s. The "MAP" brandy and wine factory is located in Lenughi.

See also 
Armavir Province

References 

World Gazeteer: Armenia – World-Gazetteer.com

Populated places in Armavir Province